KGAM may refer to :

 KGAM (FM), a radio station (106.3 FM) licensed to serve Merced, California, United States
 KCOD, a defunct radio station (1450 AM) formerly licensed to serve Palm Springs, California, which held the call sign KGAM from 1997 to 2010